Urupá is a municipality located in the Brazilian state of Rondônia. Its population was 11,272 (2020) and its area is 832 km2.

References

Municipalities in Rondônia